The Nobel Memorial Prize in Economic Sciences, officially known as The Sveriges Riksbank Prize in Economic Sciences in Memory of Alfred Nobel (Swedish: Sveriges riksbanks pris i ekonomisk vetenskap till Alfred Nobels minne), is an award funded by Sveriges Riksbank and is annually awarded by the Royal Swedish Academy of Sciences to researchers in the field of economic sciences. The first prize was awarded in 1969 to Ragnar Frisch and Jan Tinbergen. Each recipient receives a medal, a diploma and a monetary award that has varied throughout the years. In 1969, Frisch and Tinbergen were given a combined 375,000 SEK, which is equivalent to 2,871,041 SEK in December 2007. The award is presented in Stockholm at an annual ceremony on December 10, the anniversary of Nobel's death.

As of the awarding of the 2022 prize, 54 Prizes in Economic Sciences have been given to 92 individuals. As of November 2022, the department of economics with the most affiliated laureates in economic sciences is the University of Chicago, with 15 affiliated laureates. As of 2022, the institutions with the most PhD (or equivalent) graduates who went on to receive the prize are Harvard University and MIT (13), followed by the University of Chicago (9).
As of 2022, the institutions with the most affiliated faculty at the time of the award are the University of Chicago (15), followed by MIT (8) and Harvard University (7).

Laureates

See also
List of Nobel laureates

References

Citations

Sources

External links
 Official website of the Sveriges Riksbank Prize in Economic Sciences in Memory of Alfred Nobel
 Official website of the Royal Swedish Academy of Sciences
 Official website of the Nobel Foundation

Economics awards

 
Economics